Jerome Daniel Hannan (November 29, 1896 – December 15, 1965) was an American prelate of the Roman Catholic Church. He served as bishop of the Diocese of Scranton from 1954 until his death in 1965.

Biography

Early life 
Jerome Hannan was born on November 29, 1896, in Pittsburgh, Pennsylvania, to James and Rose (née Tiernan) Hannan. He studied at Duquesne University in Pittsburgh, from where he obtained a Bachelor of Arts degree in 1916, and then at St. Vincent's Seminary in Latrobe, earning a Doctor of Divinity in 1920.

Priesthood 
Hannan was ordained to the priesthood by Archbishop Regis Canevin for the Diocese of Pittsburgh on May 22, 1921. He then served as administrator of Holy Trinity Church in McKeesport, Pennsylvania, and curate at Holy Rosary Parish in Pittsburgh until 1923, when he became chaplain at Mount Mercy Academy. He was also private secretary to Bishop Hugh Charles Boyle from 1923 to 1931.

Hannan earned a Bachelor of Laws degree from Duquesne University in Pittsburgh in 1931, and a Doctor of Canon Law degree from the School of Canon Law at Catholic University of America in Washington, D.C. in 1934. He also served as assistant chancellor of the diocese (1934-1939), administrator of St. Paul's Cathedral in Pittsburgh (1937-1939). Hannan then moved to Washington to serve as an associate professor of canon law (1940-1951) and vice-rector (1951-1954) at Catholic University of America. Hannan also served as editor of the journal The Jurist: Studies in Church Law and Ministry.

Bishop of Scranton 
On August 17, 1954, Hannan was appointed the fifth bishop of the Diocese of Scranton by Pope Pius XII. He received his episcopal consecration on September 21, 1954, from Archbishop Amleto Cicognani, with Archbishop Patrick O'Boyle and Bishop Henry Klonowski serving as co-consecrators, in Washington, D.C.  During his tenure, Hannan oversaw the construction of the chancery building and Saint Pius X Seminary.

Death and legacy 
Jerome Hannan died in Rome on December 15, 1965, where he was attending the closing session of the Second Vatican Council; he was age 69.

In 2018, the University of Scranton renamed Hannan Hall after a Pennsylvania grand jury determined that he covered up child sex abuse by clergy in the diocese.

References

External links
Diocese of Scranton

1896 births
1965 deaths
Duquesne University alumni
Catholic University of America alumni
Religious leaders from Pittsburgh
Participants in the Second Vatican Council
20th-century Roman Catholic bishops in the United States
Catholic University of America School of Canon Law alumni
Catholic University of America School of Canon Law faculty